is a Japanese football player who plays for Tokyo Verdy.

National team career
In August 2007, Kawano was elected Japan U-17 national team for 2007 U-17 World Cup. He played all 3 matches and scored a goal against Haiti.

Club statistics
Updated to end of 2018 season.

1Includes Japanese Super Cup.

National team career statistics

Appearances in major competitions

Honours
 Japan National Team
AFC U-17 Championship : 2006

References

External links

Profile at Sagan Tosu
Profile at FC Tokyo

1990 births
Living people
Association football people from Kanagawa Prefecture
Japanese footballers
Japan youth international footballers
J1 League players
J2 League players
Tokyo Verdy players
FC Tokyo players
Sagan Tosu players
Association football midfielders